Alan Bridson Cribb Jr. (born 5 October 1925) is an Australian botanist and mycologist and an expert in marine and freshwater algae and seaweeds. He has also written on native and wild foods of Australia.

Early life 
Alan Bridson Cribb Jr. was born in Ipswich, Queensland on 5 October 1925, the son of Alan Bridson Cribb, a grazier and his wife, Dorothy Shand. He grew up around Longreach and his father instructed him in a love for the Australian bush and an interest in natural history. The extended Cribb family lived in Ipswich, where the family business Cribb & Foote department store was located.

Cribb studied at the University of Queensland, taking his B.Sc with first class honours in 1948. He collected algae on a UQ Science Students excursion to Noosa Heads in 1948, and this collection was used to forward his future field of study. Queensland did not have any experts in algae at the time. Cribb travelled to New Zealand where he studied under Professor Val Chapman, before moving into his Honours program. He took up a position as a demonstrator in the Department of Botany and worked with visiting academic Dr Tore Levring of Sweden studying marine algae on Heron Island. Cribb was appointed a research officer with the CSIRO Division of Fisheries and Oceanography at Cronulla in 1950. He escorted Professor Lily Newton, a British expert in seaweeds, when she came to Australia at the invitation of CSIR (now CSIRO) in 1950. Cribb spent two years reviewing algae, especially Macrocystis from Tasmania. He returned to Queensland in 1952, taking up work as a botany lecturer at the University of Queensland. He took his PhD in 1958. He was Head of the Department of Biology from 1978 to 1982 and remained in the department until his retirement in 1988.

Extended research 
Cribb's research continued into marine algae of southern Queensland and the Great Barrier Reef. He published over 135 papers and books. He also presented evidence to the 1973 Royal Commission into exploratory and production drilling for petroleum of the Great Barrier Reef. He and his wife also contributed on a report on the revegetation of South Stradbroke Island following sand mining activity in 1971. He participated in four expeditions of the Royal Geographical Society of Queensland. He prepared documentation on the distribution of flora in Queensland for use by staff of the National Parks & Wildlife Service. His work on the Great Barrier Reef established classification systems for algae of the intertidal reefs. He and his wife, researcher Dr Joan Cribb completed two volumes on bush and wild foods, with material from Desmond Herbert and notes from Raymond Specht's Arnhem Land Expedition of 1948.

Personal life 
Cribb married Joan Herbert in 1954. Together he and his wife (as Joan Cribb) published a number of books on marine fungi and wild foods.

Memberships and Awards 
President and Editor – Queensland Naturalists Club (twice)

Member – Australian Marine Sciences Association

Member – Australasian Society for Phycology and Aquatic Botany

Member – British Phycological Society

Member – American Phycological Society

Member – Indian Phycological Society

Member – Royal Society of Queensland

1997 – Queensland Natural History Award

2001 – Natural History Medallion

Legacy 
His taxonomic work included the identification of 24 algae, 14 marine fungi and 1 flowering plant. The algal herbarium he had established at the University of Queensland was transferred to the Queensland Herbarium and is central to that collection.

References 

1925 births
Possibly living people
Australian mycologists
Australian phycologists
People from Ipswich, Queensland
University of Queensland alumni
Academic staff of the University of Queensland